KJZT-LP (90.1 FM, "Jazz Tulsa") was an American low-power radio station in Tulsa, Oklahoma that broadcast a smooth jazz format.

History
The station started as "Jazz Tulsa 107.9".

Tulsa Community radio surrendered KJZT-LP's license to the Federal Communications Commission (FCC) on May 27, 2021; the FCC cancelled the station's license the same day.

References

External links
 

JZT-LP
JZT-LP
Radio stations established in 2005
2005 establishments in Oklahoma
Radio stations disestablished in 2021
2021 disestablishments in Oklahoma
Defunct radio stations in the United States
JZT-LP